King Kalu (born ) is a Nigerian male weightlifter, competing in the 62 kg category and representing Nigeria at international competitions. He participated at the 2014 Commonwealth Games in the 62 kg event.

Major competitions

References

1995 births
Living people
Nigerian male weightlifters
Place of birth missing (living people)
Weightlifters at the 2014 Commonwealth Games
Commonwealth Games competitors for Nigeria
African Games medalists in weightlifting
African Games silver medalists for Nigeria
Competitors at the 2019 African Games
20th-century Nigerian people
21st-century Nigerian people